Pacific States University (PSU) is a private university in Los Angeles, California.  Founded in 1928 as an independent private institution, it has provided an education in the fields of business and computer science to more than 10,000 graduates. PSU offers bachelor of business administration (BBA), master of science in computer science and information systems (MS in CS/IS), and master of business administration (MBA in various concentrations) degrees. Its MS and MBA degrees are both STEM designated. Prospective students can apply to PSU using this online application: https://www.psuca.edu/apply/ 

PSU is owned by Konkuk University.

PSU is approved by BPPE and is accredited by ACCSC.

A faculty of about 36 fulltime/ adjunct professors serve as of the school year 2022. The student body is drawn from the United States and 40 other countries. The library houses multiple volumes and subscribes to over 50 periodical and professional journals. Students have access to Melvyl, which is the online catalog network for the campuses of the University of California. Other university libraries, as well as the Los Angeles Public Library (LAPL), make their materials available to students.

Campus 
The campus is in Southern California, in a part of the City of Los Angeles known as Koreatown. The campus contains the administrative offices, classrooms, a computer lab, student lounges and the main library of the university.

Organization 
PSU has two colleges:

College of Business
College of Computer Science & Information Systems

References

External links 

 Official website

Universities and colleges in Los Angeles County, California
Educational institutions established in 1928
Business schools in California
Colleges accredited by the Accrediting Council for Independent Colleges and Schools
Konkuk University
Private universities and colleges in California
1928 establishments in California